Barrage is a 2017 Luxembourgian drama film directed by Laura Schroeder and starring Isabelle Huppert and her real-life daughter Lolita Chammah. It was selected as the Luxembourgish entry for the Best Foreign Language Film at the 90th Academy Awards, but it was not nominated.

Plot
Over the course of a turbulent weekend, three generations of women reunite and move apart.

Cast
 Lolita Chammah as Catherine
 Themis Pauwels as Alba
 Isabelle Huppert as Elisabeth

Reception
On review aggregator website Rotten Tomatoes, the film holds an approval rating of 50% based on 10 reviews, and an average rating of 5.1/10. On Metacritic, the film has a weighted average score of 54 out of 100, based on 7 critics, indicating "mixed or average reviews".

See also
 Isabelle Huppert on screen and stage
 List of submissions to the 90th Academy Awards for Best Foreign Language Film
 List of Luxembourgish submissions for the Academy Award for Best Foreign Language Film

References

External links
 

2017 films
2017 drama films
Luxembourgian drama films
2010s French-language films